Tom Spencer (born 2 January 1991) is an English former professional rugby league footballer who last played as a  for Oldham R.L.F.C. in the RFL Championship.

He previously played for the Wigan Warriors (Heritage № 1029) in the Super League, and on loan from Wigan at Leigh in the Championship and the South Wales Scorpions in Championship 1. Spencer has also played for the Centurions in the Championship, and on loan from the Leigh Centurions at Oldham (Heritage № 1362) in the Championship He also featured for the London Broncos in the Betfred Championship.

Background
Spencer was born in Wigan, Greater Manchester, England.

He is the brother of Amy Spencer, a retired English sprinter.

Career
Before joining the Leigh Centurions full-time, Spencer played for the Wigan Warriors. However, he played most of his Wigan Warriors career on dual registration with Leigh Centurions. After playing 96 games for Leigh, Spencer signed for the London Broncos for the 2017 and 2018 seasons.

Swinton Lions (loan)
On 18 June 2021 he joined Swinton Lions on a short-term 2-week loan

Oldham R.L.F.C.
On 17 Nov 2021 it was reported that he had signed for Oldham R.L.F.C. in the RFL Championship

References

External links

London Broncos profile

1991 births
Living people
English rugby league players
Leigh Leopards players
London Broncos players
Oldham R.L.F.C. players
Rugby league props
Rugby league players from Wigan
South Wales Scorpions players
Swinton Lions players
Wigan Warriors players